Lorik is a predominantly Albanian masculine given name, it is derived from the Latin name Laurentius. Notable people bearing the name Lorik include:

Lorik Ademi (born 2001), Swedish footballer 
Lorik Cana (born 1983), Albanian footballer
Lorik Emini (born 1999), Kosovan footballer 
Lorik Maxhuni (born 1992), Kosovan footballer 

Masculine given names
Albanian masculine given names